The Alfred Caldwell Lily Pool, also known as Lincoln Park Lily Pool, is an important example of Prairie School landscape architecture designed by Alfred Caldwell and located at 125 W. Fullerton Parkway (between Stockton and Cannon Drives) in Lincoln Park, Chicago, Illinois.  Developed in 1936-38, it is one of Caldwell's most fully realized designs. It was designated a Chicago Landmark on November 6, 2002. It was listed on the National Register of Historic Places and as a National Historic Landmark on February 17, 2006.

History
A Victorian-style artificially heated lily pool had originally been built in 1889 at the behest of Lincoln Park Commission Superintendent John Pettigrew to cultivate tropical water lilies. The pool area is located just north of Lincoln Park Zoo and next to the Lincoln Park Conservatory.

Features

The Rookery 
In the early 1950s, under Zoo Director Marlin Perkins,  the pool was transformed into a water exhibit featuring exotic birds and water fowl and came to be known as The Rookery. Overgrazing by zoo birds had a devastating effect on the lily pond. A lack of landscaping management allowed invasive plants and "weed" trees to take over the understory. Combined with heavy human foot traffic, uncontrolled erosion, the introduction of plants materials that were invasive to the existing lilies, and inappropriate repairs (eroded areas covered with loose stones) this resulted in what Caldwell called (in 1990) "a dead world".

Renovation
From 1998 to 2002, the 2.7 acre Lily Pool underwent a major restoration by the Chicago Park District and the Lincoln Park Conservancy.
The Friends of Lincoln Park (now called The Lincoln Park Conservancy) raised $1.2 million toward the restoration of the lily pools. A similar sum was obtained from a grant from the USDA Forest Service. Wolff Landscape Architecture was hired to complete the project.
 
Five focus groups were conducted to develop a consensus plan for restoration of the site;
experts in historic preservation, 
bird watchers and ecologists,
Individuals knowledgeable about Lincoln Park and active in its planning and management,
activists and experts on the subject of accessibility, 
members of the general public.

The Chicago Park District and the Lincoln Park Conservancy manage a docent program at the Caldwell Lily Pool.

Location
The Lily Pool's main gate is on the south side of Fullerton Parkway between Stockton and Cannon Drives (125 W Fullerton Parkway).

The Lily Pool is open seasonally from mid-April to mid-November from 7:30 a.m. to the earlier of dusk or 7:30 p.m.  It is maintained by the Chicago Park District and Lincoln Park Conservancy.

Free docent tours are available to the public on Fridays, Saturdays or Sundays from the Spring through Fall.

See also

 National Register of Historic Places listings in Chicago
 List of National Historic Landmarks in Illinois

References

Historic district contributing properties in Illinois
Buildings and structures completed in 1938
Landscape architecture
National Historic Landmarks in Chicago
Parks on the National Register of Historic Places in Chicago
1938 establishments in Illinois
Chicago Landmarks